Jakov Orfelin (Cyrillic Serbian: Јаков Орфелин, born in Vukovar or Sremski Karlovci, Habsburg monarchy, c. mid-eighteenth century – Arad, Habsburg Monarchy, 20  October 1803) was a Serbian Baroque painter. 
He made iconostasis for the churches of Bačka and Syrmia regions and also some portraits. He is the nephew of the painter, engraver and writer Zaharije Orfelin.

Biography
Jakov Orfelin received his first artistic education from his uncle Zaharije Orfelin, with whom he collaborated on church commissions later. In 1766, he pursued his art studies in Vienna at the Art Academy and took courses at the newly-founded engraving academy directed by Jacob Matthias Schmutzer (1733-1811).
One of his earliest work was the iconostasis in Grgeteg Monastery (1774) which was in 1902 replaced with the iconostasis done by Uroš Predić. In 1780-1781, he collaborated with Teodor Kračun in the iconostasis painting of the St. Nicholas Cathedral of Sremski Karlovci, considered by the Serbian Academy of Sciences and Arts to be "a summit of Baroque painting in Vojvodina".

Works

Iconostases
The iconostasis of the St. Nicholas Cathedral of Sremski Karlovci is his most famous work.
 1773: the iconostasis of the Church of St. Nicholas of Kikinda, sometimes attributed to Teodor Ilić Češljar;
 1774: the first iconostasis of the church of the monastery of Grgeteg;
 1776: the iconostasis of the Church of St. Sava in Maradik;
 1778: the iconostasis of the Church of the Transfiguration of Obrež;
 1780: the iconostasis of the church of St. Luke Kupinovo, attributed to Jakov Orfelin;
 1780-1781: the iconostasis of the St. Nicholas Cathedral of Sremski Karlovci, in collaboration with Teodor Kračun;
 1788: the iconostasis of the church of St. Theodore-Tiron of Irig;
 1790: the iconostasis of the Church of the Presentation-of-the-Mother-of-God-in-Temple of Stapar;
 1792: the iconostasis of the Church of St. George Ratkovo;
 1793: the iconostasis of the church Saint-Gabriel (Saint-Michel) of Veliki Radinci;
 1794: the iconostasis of the Church of St. Nicholas of Kraljevci;
 1797: the iconostasis of the Church of St. George of Jarak, in collaboration with Stefan Gavrilović
 1802: The iconostasis of the church of Bezdin Monastery near Arad.

Portraits
 Portrait of Jovan Haranitović, priest in Kraljevci
 Portrait of Marta Tekelija (the wife of Jovan Tekelija), before 1791, Gallery of the Matica srpska

Other
 Jakov Orfelin's representation of Tsar Dušan the Mighty to illustrate Jovan Rajić's "Istorija raznih slovenskih narodov, najpače Bolgar, Horvatov i Serbov" (History of various Slav peoples, especially Bulgarians, Croats and Serbs), published for the first time in 1768 and in an edition in four volumes in 1794-1795, also served as a direct source of inspiration for those who came after him, for example, Đura Jakšić's painting of the same ruler in 1857.

See also
 List of painters from Serbia

References

External links
Mother of God with Christ, Jakov Orfelin – a throne icon at iconostasis of church in Kraljevci, Srem

18th-century Serbian painters
18th-century male artists
18th-century births
Year of birth missing
1803 deaths